Anderson Creek may refer to:

Anderson Creek Township, Harnett County, North Carolina
Anderson Creek, North Carolina, an unincorporated community in the above township
Anderson Creek (Pennsylvania), a tributary of the West Branch Susquehanna River

See also
Anderson Fork, a stream in Ohio
Anderson River (disambiguation)